Malta competed at the 2014 Winter Olympics in Sochi, Russia from 7 to 23 February 2014. Malta made its debut at the Winter Olympics.

Competitors

Alpine skiing 

According to the final quota allocation released on January 20, 2014 Malta had qualified one athlete. Élise Pellegrin's great-grandfather had moved to France from Malta, giving her the opportunity to compete for the country.  On February 18, Pellegrin finished the giant slalom race in 65th position (out of 67 skiers who completed both runs). On February 21, she finished the slalom race in 42nd position (out of 49 skiers who completed both runs).

References

External links 
Malta at the 2014 Olympics

Nations at the 2014 Winter Olympics
2014
Winter Olympics